Choerodon is a genus of wrasses native to the Indian Ocean and the western Pacific Ocean. They are commonly referred to as tuskfish, because most species have sharp tusk-like teeth.

Species
The 24 currently recognized species in this genus are:
 Choerodon anchorago (Bloch, 1791) (orange-dotted tuskfish)
 Choerodon azurio (D. S. Jordan & Snyder, 1901) (Azurio tuskfish)
 Choerodon cauteroma M. F. Gomon & G. R. Allen, 1987 (bluespotted tuskfish)
 Choerodon cephalotes (Castelnau, 1875) (purple tuskfish)
 Choerodon cyanodus (J. Richardson, 1843) (blue tuskfish)
 Choerodon fasciatus (Günther, 1867) (harlequin tuskfish)
 Choerodon frenatus J. D. Ogilby, 1910 (bridled tuskfish)
 Choerodon gomoni G. R. Allen & J. E. Randall, 2002 (Gomon's tuskfish)
 Choerodon graphicus (de Vis, 1885) (graphic tuskfish)
 Choerodon gymnogenys (Günther, 1867)
 Choerodon jordani (Snyder, 1908) (Jordan's tuskfish)
 Choerodon margaritiferus Fowler & B. A. Bean, 1928 (pearly tuskfish)
 Choerodon melanostigma Fowler & B. A. Bean, 1928
 Choerodon monostigma J. D. Ogilby, 1910 (dark-spot tuskfish)
 Choerodon oligacanthus (Bleeker, 1851) (white-patch tuskfish)
 Choerodon paynei  Whitley, 1945 (Payne's tuskfish)
 Choerodon robustus (Günther, 1862) (robust tuskfish)
 Choerodon rubescens (Günther, 1862) (baldchin groper)
 Choerodon schoenleinii (Valenciennes, 1839) (blackspot tuskfish)
 Choerodon sugillatum M. F. Gomon, 1987 (wedge-tailed tuskfish)
 Choerodon venustus (de Vis, 1884) (Venus tuskfish)
 Choerodon vitta J. D. Ogilby, 1910 (redstripe tuskfish)
 Choerodon zamboangae (Seale & B. A. Bean, 1907) (purple eyebrowed tuskfish)
 Choerodon zosterophorus (Bleeker, 1868) (Zoster wrasse)

References

 
Labridae
Marine fish genera
Taxa named by Pieter Bleeker